Gamochaeta purpurea, the purple cudweed, purple everlasting, or spoonleaf purple everlasting, is a plant native to North America.

Description
It is a small annual herb that produces lanceolate, alternate, wooly leaves and peg-shaped flowerheads in terminal clusters. The seeds are windborne.

Habitat
It can grow on most any type of soil that is moderately moist, but prefers meadows, rocky terrain, and farmland.

Conservation status in the United States
It is listed as endangered in Massachusetts and New York, as possibly extirpated in Maine, as historical in Rhode Island, and as a special concern species in Connecticut, where it is believed extirpated.

Ethnobotany
The Houma people take a  decoction of the dried plant for colds and influenza.

Gallery

References

purpurea
Plants used in traditional Native American medicine
Taxa named by Ángel Lulio Cabrera